Little is a surname in the English language. The name is derived from the Middle English littel and the Old English lȳtel, which means "little." In some cases, the name was originally a nickname for a little man. In other cases, the name was used to distinguish the younger of two bearers of the same personal name. Early records of the name include: Litle, in 972; Litle, in about 1095; and le Lytle, in 1296. The surname has absorbed several non English-language surnames. For example, Little is sometimes a translation of the Irish Ó Beagáin, meaning "descendant of Beagán." Little can also be a translation of the French Petit and Lepetit, as well as other surnames in various languages with the same meaning ("little"), especially the German name Klein during World War II.

People

Names held by several people
Andrew Little (disambiguation), several people
Angela Little (disambiguation), several people
Anna Little (disambiguation), several people
Brian Little (disambiguation), several people
Bryan Little (disambiguation), several people
David Little (disambiguation), several people
Frank Little (disambiguation), several people
George Little (disambiguation), several people
Henry Little (disambiguation), several people
Jack Little (disambiguation), several people
James Little (disambiguation), several people
Jason Little (disambiguation), several people
John Little (disambiguation), several people
Mark Little (disambiguation), several people
Richard Little (disambiguation), several people
Robert Little (disambiguation), several people
Steve Little (disambiguation), several people
Thomas Little (disambiguation), several people
Walter Little (disambiguation), several people
William Little (disambiguation), several people

Academics
Elaine Marjory Little (1884–1974), Australian pathologist
Elbert Luther Little, (1907–2004), American botanist
Ian Little (economist), (1918–2012), British economist
Stephen Little (born 1954), American Asian art scholar, museum administrator and artist

Businesspeople
Arthur Dehon Little (1863–1935), American chemical engineer, founder of consulting company Arthur D. Little
Jacob Little (1794–1865), American investor
William Brian Little (1942–2000), American investor

Performers
Ann Little (1891–1984), American silent film actress
Booker Little (1938–1961), American jazz trumpeter
Carlo Little (1938–2005), British rock and roll drummer
Cleavon Little (1939–1992), American film and theatre actor
Jane Little (musician), American musician; bassist in the Atlanta Symphony Orchestra
Ralf Little (born 1980), English actor and comedian
Rich Little (born 1938), Canadian-American impressionist and voice actor
Syd Little (born 1942), English comedian
Tasmin Little (born 1965), English violinist

Politicians
Betty Little (born 1940), New York senator
Joseph James Little (1841–1913), US representative from New York, printer and publisher
Patrick Little (1884–1963), Irish politician
Russell M. Little (1809–1891), New York politician
Zeb Little, a Democratic member of the Alabama Senate

Sportspeople
Brendon Little (born 1996), American baseball player
Chad Little (born 1963), NASCAR driver
Emily Little (born 1994), Australian gymnast
Floyd Little (1942–2021), American football player
Grady Little (born 1950), former Major League Baseball manager
Ian Little (footballer) (born 1973), Scottish football player and manager
Kim Little (born 1990), Scottish association footballer
Lawson Little (1910–1968), American professional golfer
Nassir Little (born 2000), American basketball player
Neil Little (born 1971), Canadian former ice hockey player
Nicky Little (born 1976), Fijian rugby union player
Ricky Little (born 1989), Scottish footballer
Sally Little (born 1951), South African LPGA golfer 
Sam Little (golfer) (born 1975), English professional golfer
Tori Groves-Little (born 2000), Australian rules footballer
Walker Little (born 1999), American football player

Writers
Bentley Little (born 1960), American author
Frances Little (1863–1941), pseudonym of American author Fannie Caldwell
Jane Little (born 1972), English broadcaster and writer
Jean Little (1932–2020), Canadian author

Others
Alice Little, (born 1990), Irish–American sex-worker and advocate
Donald Little, Canadian judge
Joan Little (born 1953), African-American acquitted of murder
Ken Little (born 1947), modernist American sculptor
Lewis Henry Little (1817–1862), Confederate brigadier general during the American Civil War
Malcolm X (born Malcolm Little, 1925–1965), Afro-American civil rights leader and Nation of Islam minister
Samuel Little (1940–2020), American serial killer
Tony Little (born 1956), American TV fitness personality

Fictional characters
Bingo Little, in P. G. Wodehouse stories
 Chicken Little, also known as Henny Penny or Chicken Licken
Stuart Little, fictional mouse in many of E. B. White's short stories, and in some films

See also 
 Chicken Little (disambiguation)
 Clan Little, a Scottish Border clan
 Henny Penny (disambiguation)
 List of people known as the Little
 Lyttle, a surname

References

English-language surnames
Surnames from nicknames